Gortlud is a rural locality (a village) in Chazyovskoye Rural Settlement, Kosinsky District, Perm Krai, Russia. The population was 63 as of 2010. There is 1 street.

Geography 
Gortlud is located 29 km southwest of Kosa (the district's administrative centre) by road. Bachmanovo is the nearest rural locality.

References 

Rural localities in Kosinsky District